Barauni is an Industrial City situated on the bank of the river Ganges in the Begusarai district in the state of Bihar, India. Barauni, also spelled Baruni or Beruni, formerly Burhi Gandakpur or Jhuldabhaj town, central Bihar state, northeastern India. It lies north of the Ganges (Ganga) River and is part of the Begusarai urban agglomeration. The town merged with Phulwaria township in 1961. The name of this place came from eminent Legendary Indo-Iranian Historian & Scholar Al-Beruni who stayed here during one of his many Indian tours.

Transport

Railways 
Barauni Junction is one of the important stations in Bihar and has strategic location. It is a junction and is connected to India's main cities of New Delhi, Kolkata, Mumbai and Chennai via broad gauge routes. Barauni has three railway stations –
 Barauni Junction – where trains from Patna side enter and reverse to proceed towards North East (exception is for trains coming from Samastipur and Hajipur side where reversal is not needed),
 New Barauni Junction – at some distance in order to avoid reversal at the former. it is a bypass station of Barauni Junction which is  directly connected  to Patna and Katihar side.
 Barauni Flag – A small station on Barauni–Gorakhpur, Raxaul and Jainagar lines.

Roads 
 starts from Barauni and leads to Lucknow via Muzaffarpur.  passes through the town and leads to Purnia and Guwahati in East and Patna in west.  Both National Highways have junction here. Previously, it is the only route for Northeast India that's why it was called Assam Road.

Air 

Second Nearest Airport is  Darbhanga Airport in Darbhanga, Approximately 112 Kilometres away.

Industries 
Major industrial plants in Barauni include: -
 Barauni Thermal power, (NTPC, Barauni)
 Barauni Fertiliser Plant, (HURL Barauni)
 Barauni Refinery, (IOCL, Barauni)
 Sudha Dairy
 Pepsi bottling Plant, (Varun Beverages)

People 
 Ramdhari Singh Dinkar
 Ram Sharan Sharma

See also 
 Barauni IOC Township
 Urvarak Nagar Barauni
 Teghra (Vidhan Sabha constituency)

Direction board

References

External links 
 Bihar's football crazy girls
 One killed in India train crash
 Japanese agency keen to set up power unit at Barauni

 
Cities and towns in Begusarai district